Ribonucleoside-diphosphate reductase subunit M2, also known as ribonucleotide reductase small subunit, is an enzyme that in humans is encoded by the RRM2 gene.

Function 

This gene encodes one of two non-identical subunits for ribonucleotide reductase. This reductase catalyzes the formation of deoxyribonucleotides from ribonucleotides. Synthesis of the encoded protein (M2) is regulated in a cell-cycle dependent fashion. Transcription from this gene can initiate from alternative promoters, which results in two isoforms that differ in the lengths of their N-termini.

Interactive pathway map

References

Further reading

EC 1.17.4